Yuri Vladimirovich Shukanov (born 10 March 1971) is a Belarusian professional football coach and former player. He made his professional debut in the Soviet Second League in 1989 for KIM Vitebsk.

Honours

As a player
Dinamo Minsk
 Belarusian Premier League champion: 1992–93, 1993–94, 1995, 2004
 Belarusian Cup winner: 1993–94Maccabi Tel Aviv Israeli Premier League champion: 1994–95Kairat Almaty'''
 Kazakhstan Cup winner: 2003

As a coach
 Belarusian Premier League champion: 2004.

References

1971 births
Living people
Footballers from Minsk
Soviet footballers
Belarusian footballers
Belarus international footballers
Belarusian football managers
Belarusian expatriate footballers
Expatriate footballers in Russia
Expatriate footballers in Israel
Expatriate footballers in Kazakhstan
Russian Premier League players
Belarusian Premier League players
Israeli Premier League players
Kazakhstan Premier League players
FC Vitebsk players
FC Dinamo-93 Minsk players
FC Dinamo Minsk players
Maccabi Tel Aviv F.C. players
FC Baltika Kaliningrad players
FC KAMAZ Naberezhnye Chelny players
FC Elista players
FC Fakel Voronezh players
FC Dynamo Saint Petersburg players
FC Kairat players
FC Dinamo Minsk managers
Association football forwards
Association football midfielders